Montesquieu (1689–1755) was a French lawyer, man of letters, and political philosopher.

Montesquieu may also refer to:
 Montesquieu, Hérault, commune in the Hérault department, France
 Montesquieu, Lot-et-Garonne, commune in the Lot-et-Garonne department, France
 Montesquieu, Tarn-et-Garonne, commune in the Tarn-et-Garonne department, France